Xalé is a 2022 Senegalese thriller film directed by Moussa Sene Absa. It is the third film of the director's trilogy focused on women, following Tableau Ferraille (1995) and L'Extraordinaire destin de Madame Brouette (2002). In October 2022, the Oscars selection committee of Senegal announced the film as the country's submission to the 95th Academy Awards for Best International Feature Film.

Plot 
Set in Dakar in a time-shifting chronology, the film follows the story of two 15-year-old twins Awa (Nguissaly Barry) and Adama (Mabeye Diol). Awa is focused on her academics while her brother, Adama, hopes to emigrate to Europe. Following the death of their grandmother, they are put in the charge of their uncle Atoumane (Ibrahima M’Baye). In accordance with the grandmother's dying wish, Atoumane marries his resistant cousin Fatou (Rokhaya Niang). Her rejection of him prompts Atoumane to take out his frustration on Awa  with life-altering consequences for both of them.

Cast 

 Nguissaly Barry as Awa
 Mabeye Diol as Adama
 Ibrahima M'Baye as Atoumane
 Rokhaya Niang as Fatou

Release and screening 
It premiered at the London Film Festival. The film was also screened at Adelaide Film Festival and Mill Valley Film Festival where it had its US premiere.

References

External links 

 Xale on IMDb
2022 films
2022 thriller films
Wolof-language films
2020s French-language films
Films about teenagers